Mexican tenor Jesús León is one of the most acclaimed ‘bel canto’ tenors of his generation. His vocal studies began with the Cuban tenor Jesús Li, followed by attendance at the UCLA Opera Studio, the Solti Accademia di Bel Canto, the Boston University Opera Institute and the Domingo-Thornton Young Artist Program at Los Angeles Opera. He also trained in Italy under the direction of legendary soprano Mirella Freni, who granted him the Nicolai Ghiaurov scholarship.

Early years

His music studies began with guitar lessons at age ten and then voice lessons in the Casa de la Cultura of Sonora at age 14 while at the same time he was singing for private events in his self-created rock band, "Garage".  From 1990 to 1995, he played guitar and sang with local bands, Herson Rucks, Europa and Sahuaro and won third prize in the Valores Bacardi national music competition in 1995.

In 1996 León began professional opera studies at the University of Sonora. He sang as a tenor soloist with the university choir and performed in music festivals such as the Festival Ortiz Tirado and the Festival of Las Fronteras. In 1998 he sang in the theatrical production, La Mandrágora.

Between 1998 and 2004, as tenor and pianist, León was a member of several sacred ensembles that led him to create his own ensemble, Cantiquo. For six years he sang in the Notte di Pasta of the hotel Fiesta Americana of Hermosillo. He also recorded a CD called Recuerdo de una Notte di Pasta.

Opera career
2021-22 Season he made his debut at the Opera Comique of Paris singing Roméo in Roméo et Juliette, he sang the role of Hernan Cortes from Montezuma by Graun in the Palace of Bellas Artes Mexico and sung 6 concerts with the Royal Philharmonic Orchestra at the Royal Albert Hall. He will sing concerts with the Liverpool Philharmonic Orchestra, Munchen Philharmonic in Munich and the title role in William Tell by Rossini with Ireland National Opera.

His 2018- 2019 season included the roles of Elvino in La Sonnambula, Edgardo in Lucia di Lammermoor at the Deutsche Oper Berlinand Alfredo in La Traviata at the Minnesota Opera. He sung Roméo in Roméo et Juliette at Graz Opera, Hoffmann in Les Contes d’Hoffmann at the Palace of Bellas Artes in Mexico, a concert at the Great Hall in Moscow and 6 concerts at the Royal Albert Hall with the Royal Philharmonic Orchestra.

León's engagements in the 2017–18 season include Duca Rigoletto (Oper im Steinbruch), Edgardo in Lucia di Lammermoor Florida Grand Opera, Christmas concerts with the Royal Liverpool Philharmonic, New Year's Eve and New Day's year concert at Dubai Opera House, his role of Elvino in La Sonnambula in Staatsoper Stuttgart Opera, 7 concerts at Royal Albert Hall with the Royal Philharmonic Orchestra and as Ismael in Nabucco Opéra de Nice and Toulon Opera.

León's engagements in the 2016–18 season include Nadir in Les pêcheurs de perles (Opera di Firenze, Teatro Verdi di Trieste and Seoul Arts Centre), Il Duca Rigoletto (Opéra de Nice), Roméo in Roméo et Juliette (Royal Opera House Muscat) and Elvino La Sonnambula (Teatro Filarmonico Verona).

Other recent engagements have included Roméo in Roméo et Juliette at the Atlanta Opera, Arturo in I Puritani at the Maggio Musicale Fiorentino in Florence, Tebaldo in I Capuleti e i Montecchi at Teatro Massimo Bellini in Catania, Elvino La Sonnambula at Teatro Massimo Bellini, Teatro Comunale Mario del Monaco in Treviso, Teatro Comunale Ferrara and Teatro Alighieri Ravenna, Nadir Les pêcheurs de perles at (Opera di Firenze, Teatro Regio in Parma, Teatro Comunale Luciano Pavarotti in Modena, Korea National Opera Seoul and Daegu Opera House), Pâris in La Belle Hélène at the Chatelet Theatre in Paris, Ernesto in Don Pasquale at Tyrolean State Theatre, Alfredo in La Traviata at Scottish Opera, Dijon Opera, Théâtre de Caen, Vorarlberger Landestheater, Il Duca di Mantova in Rigoletto at Vorarlberger Landestheater, as Riccardo in Donizetti's Maria di Rohan in Berlin and Don Ottavio in Don Giovanni at Garsington Opera and Birgitta Festival.

León is also an active concert performer and has performed with Royal Philharmonic Orchestra at Royal Albert Hall, the Royal Liverpool Philharmonic Orchestra (Spirit of Christmas and New Year's Eve gala, New Year's concert), Birmingham Symphony Hall, Barbican Hall, Wigmore Hall, Orchestra Verdi in Milan (Mozart Requiem) and the Orquesta Sinfonica de Mineria (Berlioz's Romeo et Juliette).

Discography (CD)

 His debut recording Bel Canto with Royal Liverpool Philharmonic Orchestra conducted by Toby Purser, including arias by Vincenzo Bellini, Gaetano Donizetti and Giuseppe Verdi, was released in April 2015 by Opus Arte.
 Respira - Jesús León, Tenor (Selection of Mexican and Italian songs) various composers.

Awards & Grants

2020 - Winner of the Vienna International Music Competition. His award-winning concert took place same year at the Wiener Konzerthaus. 
2009 - Festival Ortiz Tirado,
2007 - Grants from  Jose Iturbi Foundation,
2007 - The Vilcek Foundation, 
2006 - The Nando Peretti Foundation,  
2006 - The Solti Foundation,
2005 - The Palm Springs Opera Guild 
2005 - The American Institute of Fine Arts
2004 - The Opera Buffs Inc. of Los Angeles.

Complete Repertoire

References

External links
 
 YouTube Video Clips
 Schedule on Operabase

Anexo:Personajes de Sonora

People from Hermosillo
Mexican operatic tenors
Singers from Sonora
Year of birth missing (living people)
Living people
20th-century Mexican male opera singers
21st-century Mexican male opera singers